Zanjanrud District is in Zanjan County, Zanjan province, Iran. At the 2006 National Census, its population was 30,426 in 7,235 households. The following census in 2011 counted 27,055 people in 7,488 households. At the latest census in 2016, the district had 23,307 inhabitants in 7,086 households.

References 

Zanjan County

Districts of Zanjan Province

Populated places in Zanjan Province

Populated places in Zanjan County